Aqsha Saniskara Prawira (born 26 September 2000) is an Indonesian professional footballer who plays as a right-back or defensive midfielder for Liga 1 club PSIS Semarang.

Club career

PSIS Semarang
He was signed for PSIS Semarang to play in Liga 1 in the 2018 season. Saniskara made his professional debut on 31 August 2019 in a match against Arema at the Kanjuruhan Stadium, Malang.

Career statistics

Club

References

External links
 Aqsha Saniskara at Soccerway

2000 births
Living people
Indonesian footballers
Liga 1 (Indonesia) players
PSIS Semarang players
Association football defenders
People from Semarang
Sportspeople from Central Java